This is a list of the National Register of Historic Places listings in Houston County, Texas.

This is intended to be a complete list of properties listed on the National Register of Historic Places in Houston County, Texas. There are seven properties listed on the National Register in the county. Three properties are Recorded Texas Historic Landmarks including one that is also a State Antiquities Landmark.

Current listings

The publicly disclosed locations of National Register properties may be seen in a mapping service provided.

|}

See also

National Register of Historic Places listings in Texas
Recorded Texas Historic Landmarks in Houston County

References

External links

Houston County, Texas
Houston County
Buildings and structures in Houston County, Texas